The East San José Carnegie Branch Library is a Carnegie library in San Jose, California, USA. It opened in 1908 and is the last Carnegie library in Santa Clara County still operating as a public library. It is a part of the San José Public Library.

History
Originally the only library in East San Jose, built for $7,000 in 1907, the library joined the City of San Jose system when East San Jose was annexed by San Jose. The original building was renovated and added to in 1981. In 1990 it was listed on the National Register of Historic Places.

Another renovation of the branch, including a  addition to the original historic structure, was begun on February 14, 2008.  The ribbon-cutting ceremony for the newly reopened branch took place at 11:00am on August 29, 2009.  The East San Jose Carnegie Library received LEED Silver certification and the 2010 Citation Award as a Distinguished Building in the adaptive re-use/renovation project category by the Santa Clara Valley Chapter of the American Institute of Architects.

The Library features a family learning center, community room, 21 computers, many family-oriented services and special language materials.

References

External links

The East San José Carnegie Branch Library information on the San José Libraries Website

Library buildings completed in 1907
Neoclassical architecture in California
Public libraries in California
Buildings and structures in San Jose, California
Libraries on the National Register of Historic Places in California
National Register of Historic Places in Santa Clara County, California
Carnegie libraries in California
Libraries in Santa Clara County, California